Charaxes smaragdalis, the western blue charaxes, is a butterfly of the family Nymphalidae. It is found from Senegal to Somalia, from Angola to Kenya and from Sudan to Egypt. 

The butterfly's wingspan is 85 to 100 mm. Adults are black with white and blue bands and spots. The hindwings each have two little tails.

Description

Ch. smaragdalis Btlr. Both wings above from the base to the apex of the cell black with greenish or  bluish reflection, then follows in the male a blue half-band, about 10 mm. in breadth, between the hindmargin and vein 2 or 3 and in each cellule from 3—7 two very widely separated spots, all blue except the distal ones in cellules 6 and 7; in the female there is in the middle a white transverse band, 7 mm. in breadth, running obliquely from the costal margin towards the hinder angle and reaching vein 1; the outer row of spots, which runs almost parallel with the distal margin in the male, is almost identical in the female. The hindwing has 
behind the apex of the cell a blue transverse band 12 (male)—15 (female) mm. in breadth and is black at the distal margin with blue-white submarginal spots and marginal line. The under surface is dark grey-brown, marked almost as in bohemanni. Niger to Angola and Uganda. — The blue transverse band on the upperside of the hindwing is narrower and everywhere completely separated from the blue marginal line. Sierra Leone to the Gold Coast.  
See External links for the original description by Arthur Gardiner Butler published in 1866 in The Proceedings of the Scientific Meetings of the Zoological Society of London.

Biology
Its habitat is (lowland rainforest in the west, gallery forest in the south, and patches of lowland and montane forest in the east).

Taxonomy
Charaxes tiridates group.

The supposed clade members are:
Charaxes tiridates
Charaxes numenes - similar to next
Charaxes bipunctatus - similar to last
Charaxes violetta
Charaxes fuscus
Charaxes mixtus
Charaxes bubastis
Charaxes albimaculatus
Charaxes barnsi
Charaxes bohemani
Charaxes schoutedeni
Charaxes monteiri
Charaxes smaragdalis
Charaxes xiphares
Charaxes cithaeron
Charaxes nandina
Charaxes imperialis
Charaxes ameliae
Charaxes pythodoris
? Charaxes overlaeti
For a full list see Eric Vingerhoedt, 2013.

Subspecies
C. s. smaragdalis (Nigeria, Cameroon, Gabon, Central African Republic, Congo, Zaire)  
C. s. butleri Rothschild, 1900 (Sierra Leone, Ivory Coast, Liberia) 
C. s. caerulea Carpenter & Jackson, 1950 (eastern Zaire, south-western Uganda)
C. s. elgonae van Someren, 1964 (Uganda)
C. s. gobyae Plantrou, 1988C. s. gobyae Plantrou, 1988  (south-eastern Sudan)
C. s. homonymus Bryk, F. 1939 (south-west Kenya , north Tanzania)
C. s. kagera van Someren, 1964 (north-western Tanzania, south-western Uganda)
C. s. kigoma van Someren, 1964 (Tanzania)
C. s. leopoldi Ghesquière, 1933(northern Angola, eastern Congo, south-western Zaire)
C. s. metu van Someren, 1964 (south-western Sudan, northern Uganda)
C. s. toro van Someren, 1964 (western Uganda)
C. s. allardi Bouyer & Vingerhoedt, 1997

References

Seitz, A. Die Gross-Schmetterlinge der Erde 13: Die Afrikanischen Tagfalter. Plate XIII 31
Victor Gurney Logan Van Someren, 1964 Revisional notes on African Charaxes (Lepidoptera: Nymphalidae). Part II. Bulletin of the British Museum (Natural History) (Entomology)181-235.
Van Someren, 1969 Revisional notes on African Charaxes (Lepidoptera: Nymphalidae). Part V. Bulletin of the British Museum (Natural History) (Entomology)75-166. Additional notes

External links
Original description
Images of C. s. allardi Royal Museum for Central Africa (Albertine Rift Project)
Images of C. s. caerulea (Albertine Rift Project)
Images of C. s. kagera (Albertine Rift Project)
Images of C. s. kigoma (Albertine Rift Project)
Images of C. s. leopoldi (Albertine Rift Project)
Images of C. s. smaragdalis (Albertine Rift Project)
"Charaxes Ochsenheimer, 1816" at Markku Savela's Lepidoptera and Some Other Life Forms
Charaxes smaragdalis images at Bold 
C. s. allardi images at BOLD
C. s. butleri images at BOLD
C. s. caerulea images at BOLD includes verso
C. s. elgonae images at BOLD
C. s. homonymus images at BOLD

Butterflies described in 1866
smaragdalis
Butterflies of Africa
Taxa named by Arthur Gardiner Butler